Francis G. Dunn was a justice of the South Dakota Supreme Court from 1973 to September 7, 1985, serving as Chief Justice from 1974 to 1978.

Early life and education
Born in Scenic, South Dakota, graduated the University of South Dakota School of Law in 1937.

Career
Dunn was a lawyer in Madison and Sioux Falls. He served as municipal judge of Sioux Falls until Governor Ralph Herseth appointed him as the state's eleventh circuit judge. In 1973, Dunn became a justice of the South Dakota Supreme Court, representing the Second district.

References

Justices of the South Dakota Supreme Court
Year of birth missing
People from Pennington County, South Dakota
People from Sioux Falls, South Dakota
Year of death missing
People from Madison, South Dakota